Players Club may refer to:

The Players Club, 1998 film
The Players Club (soundtrack)
The Players (New York City), known as the Players Club
"Playaz Club", single by Rappin' 4-Tay from the 1994 album Don't Fight the Feelin'''
"Players Club", song by Rae Sremmurd from the 2018 album SR3MM''
The Players Club (record label), a sub-label for Mascot Label Group